Phos-Chek is a brand of long-term fire retardants, class A foams, and gels manufactured by Perimeter Solutions, headquartered in Clayton, Missouri.

Products

Fire retardants

Phos-Chek fire retardants are manufactured as dry powders or as concentrated liquids and diluted with water prior to use.  The retardant is applied ahead of wildfires to homes and vegetation by ground crews and aerial firefighting units, either fixed-wing or rotary-wing aircraft. As of 2022, Phos-Chek LC-95A is the most used fire retardant in the world.

The red color aids aircrews in targeting drops of retardant.

Some of the main components of Phos-Chek retardants include ammonium polyphosphate, diammonium phosphate, diammonium sulfate, monoammonium phosphate, attapulgus clay, guar gum (or a derivative of guar gum), and trade secret performance additives. Fire retardants are manufactured as several different formulations with varying proportions of the above components. 

The phosphate and sulfate salts act as fire retardants and prevent combustion of cellulosic materials. Phosphate can also act as a fertilizer once the fire danger has passed. Guar gum and clay are thickening agents to prevent dispersal of the retardant after it is dropped from the plane.  Other ingredients include corrosion inhibitors and flow conditioners. Phos-Chek and other retardants based on ammonium phosphate may cause algae blooms in bodies of water when washed downstream and may increase the growth of invasive plant species.

Class A foam
Phos-Chek WD-881 is a mixture of anionic surfactants, foam stabilizers, and solvents including hexylene glycol.  As a fire-fighting foam, it is used as a short-term fire suppressant.

History

The first Phos-Chek retardant product was available in 1962, and was the first phosphate-based fire retardant approved by the United States Forest Service. The Phos-Chek brand belonged to the Monsanto Company until 1998, when ownership was transferred to Solutia Inc. In 2000, Astaris LLC acquired the Phos-Chek name. In November 2005, Astaris LLC was acquired by Israel Chemicals Ltd. (ICL), and the Phos-Chek brand was renamed "PHOS-CHEK Fire Safety Group" and assigned to the Performance Products division of ICL (ICL PPLP). In 2018, private investment firm SK Capital acquired the Fire Safety and Oil Additives businesses of ICL and renamed it Perimeter Solutions, and the PHOS-CHEK brand was acquired with the business.

Manufacturing
The Airbase Service Center, located in Post Falls, Idaho supports all bulk bases (equipment and product support to agency operated bases), SEAT bases (equipment and product support for Single Engine Air Tanker Bases), and Portable Base Operations (mobile rotor and fixed-wing bases). Various equipment maintenance and base rebuilds are performed from this location. Fabrication of liquid concentrate tanks, batch mixers, Hopper Units, and various other equipment is performed from this location.

References

External links

 

Fire suppression agents
Flame retardants
Aerial firefighting
Post Falls, Idaho
Companies based in Idaho
Companies established in 1962